Romeo (until 2021 PlanetRomeo) is a social network for gay, bisexual, queer and transgender people. The site was started as a hobby and was called GayRomeo in October 2002 by Planetromeo GmbH in Berlin, Germany. Initially only available in German the site and later its mobile app have evolved into an international platform.

History
Initially, the site was available only in German and hence it used to have a majority of users being from German-speaking countries. The website and apps are currently available in six languages. The German-speaking community remains the largest community but not the majority. It has been operated by Planetromeo B.V. located in Amsterdam, Netherlands since September 2006. The site name was changed from GayRomeo to PlanetRomeo.

In 2021, the name was changed again—from PlanetRomeo to simply Romeo. The Romeo website, iOS app and Android app are commonly used by the male gay community to find friends, dates, love or obtain information about LGBT+ topics.

Blue Pages
In Germany, due to its high number of registered users, ROMEO is often called the "Gay Registry Office" (schwules Einwohnermeldeamt) or "The Blue pages" (Die blauen Seiten), referring to the well known telephone directories the yellow pages and the white pages. In a satirical reference to the Nazis' compilation of lists of homosexual men in the 1930s, the German newspaper "Taz" announced: "The pink lists are back".

Features

Personal profiles
To access Romeo, users (affectionately referred to as Romeos) create a profile which can include a physical description, a list of sexual preferences, personal interests and one or more photographs of themselves. Sex workers and escorts can also advertise their services by creating their own profiles on the Hunqz section of the website.

Clubs and Guide profiles
Aside from personal messaging, Romeo offers users the chance to create Club and Guide profiles as another way of connecting with gay men sharing similar interests. For example, a bar or sauna creates a Club or Guide profile, to which Romeos either can join and or link their private profiles. The administrators of the Club and Guide profiles can send direct messages to their members. Club members exchange news or discuss various subjects in the club's forum or via a newsletter. Clubs also exist for supporters of political parties, members of religious groups and employees working in particular industries; some clubs have a more playful and sexual orientation. Any user can create a club-profile.

In March 2009 the online community Guys4Men.com joined ROMEO.

Community information
In February 2007, Romeo launched a live and online health advice service in cooperation with Deutsche Aids-Hilfe, Germany's national NGO for HIV/Aids issues. Contact information for HIV/AIDS support groups and organisations in Germany, Austria, and Switzerland is also provided on the website. Romeos receive answers online about health and best practices for safer sex; many of the health supporters speak more than one language. Other links lead to the ROMEO Blog and PlanetRomeo Foundation.

See also

References

External links

LGBT social networking services
LGBT-related Internet forums
Internet properties established in 2002
Same sex online dating
Gay men's websites
Online dating services of Germany